Sir Phiroze Jamshedji Jeejeebhoy (1915–1980) was the Chairman of the Bombay Stock Exchange (BSE) from 1966, until his death in 1980. The Bombay Stock Exchange is the largest of its kind in India, and one of the busiest in the world.

Jeejeebhoy was one of the longest-serving members of the BSE, and significantly impacted the course of its development. The building the Exchange is currently housed in is located at Dalal Street in downtown Mumbai, and bears his name - Phiroze Jeejeebhoy Towers.

References 

Parsi people
1980 deaths
1915 births